DeAndre Elliott (born November 21, 1992) is an American football cornerback who plays for the Reyes de Jalisco. He played college football at Colorado State.

College career
Elliott was a four-year starter at Colorado State. As a senior in 2015, he recorded 32 tackles, two interceptions, four pass breakups, and a blocked kick in 11 starts. He finished his college career with seven interceptions, including one returned 76 yards for a touchdown, 27 pass breakups, two fumble recoveries, and 124 tackles.

Elliott earned his bachelor's degree in communication studies.

Professional career

Elliott signed with the Seattle Seahawks as an undrafted free agent on May 6, 2016. He played in 13 regular season games as a rookie, as well as two playoff games, mostly on special teams.

On September 2, 2017, Elliott was placed on injured reserve.

On July 26, 2018, Elliot was waived by the Seattle Seahawks after a failed physical.

References

External links
Colorado State Rams bio

1992 births
Living people
American football cornerbacks
Colorado State Rams football players
Seattle Seahawks players
Reyes de Jalisco players
American expatriate players of American football
American expatriate sportspeople in Mexico
Players of American football from Dallas